Mailyn González Pozo (born December 29, 1980 in Santiago de Cuba) is a female fencer from Cuba. She competed for her native country at the 2008 Summer Olympics in the sabre competition, and won two gold medals at the 2007 Pan American Games.

References
 sports-reference

1980 births
Living people
Cuban female sabre fencers
Olympic fencers of Cuba
Fencers at the 2007 Pan American Games
Fencers at the 2008 Summer Olympics
Pan American Games gold medalists for Cuba
Pan American Games medalists in fencing
Medalists at the 2007 Pan American Games
20th-century Cuban women
20th-century Cuban people
21st-century Cuban women